Holme Hale railway station was located in Holme Hale, Norfolk, near Swaffham. It was on the Great Eastern Railway line between Swaffham and Thetford, and closed in 1964.

References

Disused railway stations in Norfolk
Former Great Eastern Railway stations
Beeching closures in England
Railway stations in Great Britain opened in 1875
Railway stations in Great Britain closed in 1964